{{Hatnote|The rosefinches should not be confused with the rosy finches in the genus Leucosticte.}}

The rosefinches are a genus, Carpodacus, of passerine birds in the finch family Fringillidae. Most are called "rosefinches" and as the word implies, have various shades of red in their plumage. The common rosefinch is frequently called the "rosefinch". The genus name is from the Ancient Greek terms karpos, "fruit", and dakno, "to bite".

The Carpodacus rosefinches occur throughout Eurasia, but the greatest diversity is found in the Sino-Himalayas suggesting that the species originated in this region.

 Systematics 
In 2012, Zuccon and colleagues published a comprehensive molecular phylogenetic analysis of the finch family. Based both on their own results and those published earlier by other groups, they proposed a series of changes to the taxonomy. They found that the three North American rosefinches, namely Cassin's finch, purple finch, and house finch, formed a separate clade that was not closely related to the Palearctic rosefinches. They proposed moving the three species to a separate genus Haemorhous. This proposal was accepted by the International Ornithological Committee and the American Ornithologists' Union. Zuccon and colleagues also found that the common rosefinch (Carpodacus erythrinus) fell outside the core rosefinch clade and was a sister to the scarlet finch (at the time Haematospiza sipahi). They recommended that the common rosefinch should be moved to a new monotypic genus with the resurrected name of Erythrina. The British Ornithologists' Union accepted this proposal, but the International Ornithological Union chose instead to adopt a more inclusive Carpodacus which incorporated Haematospiza as well as the monotypic genus Chaunoproctus containing the extinct Bonin grosbeak. The long-tailed rosefinch that had previously been included in the monotypic genus Uragus was also moved into Carpodacus.

Two species that were formerly included in the genus, Blanford's rosefinch and the dark-breasted rosefinch, were shown to not be closely related to the other species in the group. They were moved to separate monotypic genera, Blanford's rosefinch to Agraphospiza and the dark-breasted rosefinch to Procarduelis.

Sillem's rosefinch originally had the common name "Sillem's mountain finch" and was assigned to the genus Leucosticte but a phylogenetic analysis using mitochondrial DNA sequences published in 2016 found that the species belonged to the genus Carpodacus.

There have been a number of rosefinch radiations. First to split off were the ancestors of the North American species, the common rosefinch, and the scarlet finch, generally placed in its own genus. These groups, which may be related, diverged in the Middle Miocene (about 14–12 mya) from the proto-rosefinches. Each of these groups probably should constitute a distinct genus; in the case of the North American species, this is Haemorhous. The types of the genera Erythrina Brehm 1829 and Carpodacus Kaup 1829 are frequently considered to be the common rosefinch, but both refer to Pallas's rosefinch.

Molecular phylogenetic studies have shown that Hawaiian honeycreepers are closely related to the rosefinches in the genus Carpodacus. The most recent common ancestor has been variously estimate at 7.24 million years ago (mya) and 15.71 mya.

Przewalski's "rosefinch" (Urocynchramus pylzowi) has been determined to be not a rosefinch, and indeed not a true finch at all, but to constitute a monotypic family Urocynchramidae.

 Species 
The genus Carpodacus'' contains 28 species. They all include 'rosefinch' in their English names apart from the purple finch, scarlet finch, the crimson-browed finch and the extinct Bonin grosbeak.

References

External links 
Rosefinche videos, photos and sounds on the Internet Bird Collection